The 1974–75 Pittsburgh Penguins season was the franchise's eighth season in the National Hockey League. It was also the Penguins first season in the Norris division of the Prince of Wales Conference. The team qualified for the playoffs for the third time in franchise history, losing to the New York Islanders after gaining a 3–0 lead (in a best-of-seven series) in the quarter-final round.

Offseason
In early 1975, newspapers reported that the California Golden Seals and Penguins were to be relocated to Denver and Seattle respectively, in an arrangement that would have seen the two teams sold to groups in those cities that had already been awarded "conditional" franchises for the 1976–77 season. After staunchly rejecting previous franchise relocation attempts, league president Clarence Campbell saw this as a method by which the NHL might extricate itself from two problem markets, while honoring the expansion commitments it had made. However Seattle Totems owner Vince Abbey missed an opportunity to acquire the Penguins when they were sold in a bankruptcy auction for $4.4 million in June 1975. The Penguins ended up staying in Pittsburgh and ultimately, over time, made Pittsburgh one of the NHL's stronger markets.

Regular season

Final standings

Schedule and results

|- style="background:#cfc;"
| 1 || Oct 9 || Pittsburgh Penguins || 4–2 || Minnesota North Stars || Met Center || 1–0–0 || 2
|- style="background:#cfc;"
| 2 || Oct 12 || Detroit Red Wings || 2–7 || Pittsburgh Penguins || Civic Arena || 2–0–0 || 4
|- style="background:#fcf;"
| 3 || Oct 19 || Philadelphia Flyers || 6–3 || Pittsburgh Penguins || Civic Arena || 2–1–0 || 4
|- style="background:#fcf;"
| 4 || Oct 20 || Pittsburgh Penguins || 1–5 || Atlanta Flames || Omni Coliseum || 2–2–0 || 4
|- style="background:#ffc;"
| 5 || Oct 23 || Boston Bruins || 5–5 || Pittsburgh Penguins || Civic Arena || 2–2–1 || 5
|- style="background:#fcf;"
| 6 || Oct 26 || New York Rangers || 5–4 || Pittsburgh Penguins || Civic Arena || 2–3–1 || 5
|- style="background:#fcf;"
| 7 || Oct 28 || Pittsburgh Penguins || 0–2 || Los Angeles Kings || The Forum || 2–4–1 || 5
|-

|- style="background:#fcf;"
| 8 || Nov 1 || Pittsburgh Penguins || 4–7 || Vancouver Canucks || Pacific Coliseum || 2–5–1 || 5
|- style="background:#ffc;"
| 9 || Nov 3 || Pittsburgh Penguins || 3–3 || Chicago Black Hawks || Chicago Stadium || 2–5–2 || 6
|- style="background:#cfc;"
| 10 || Nov 5 || Pittsburgh Penguins || 5–3 || Kansas City Scouts || Kemper Arena || 3–5–2 || 8
|- style="background:#fcf;"
| 11 || Nov 7 || Los Angeles Kings || 5–3 || Pittsburgh Penguins || Civic Arena || 3–6–2 || 8
|- style="background:#cfc;"
| 12 || Nov 9 || California Golden Seals || 2–5 || Pittsburgh Penguins || Civic Arena || 4–6–2 || 10
|- style="background:#fcf;"
| 13 || Nov 10 || Pittsburgh Penguins || 3–8 || Buffalo Sabres || Buffalo Memorial Auditorium || 4–7–2 || 10
|- style="background:#cfc;"
| 14 || Nov 13 || New York Islanders || 2–8 || Pittsburgh Penguins || Civic Arena || 5–7–2 || 12
|- style="background:#cfc;"
| 15 || Nov 16 || Washington Capitals || 1–8 || Pittsburgh Penguins || Civic Arena || 6–7–2 || 14
|- style="background:#cfc;"
| 16 || Nov 17 || Pittsburgh Penguins || 6–0 || Washington Capitals || Capital Centre || 7–7–2 || 16
|- style="background:#fcf;"
| 17 || Nov 19 || Pittsburgh Penguins || 3–4 || New York Islanders || Nassau Veterans Memorial Coliseum || 7–8–2 || 16
|- style="background:#cfc;"
| 18 || Nov 20 || Pittsburgh Penguins || 8–5 || Toronto Maple Leafs || Maple Leaf Gardens || 8–8–2 || 18
|- style="background:#ffc;"
| 19 || Nov 23 || Los Angeles Kings || 0–0 || Pittsburgh Penguins || Civic Arena || 8–8–3 || 19
|- style="background:#fcf;"
| 20 || Nov 24 || Pittsburgh Penguins || 5–7 || New York Rangers || Madison Square Garden (IV) || 8–9–3 || 19
|- style="background:#fcf;"
| 21 || Nov 27 || Montreal Canadiens || 3–2 || Pittsburgh Penguins || Civic Arena || 8–10–3 || 19
|- style="background:#ffc;"
| 22 || Nov 30 || Buffalo Sabres || 5–5 || Pittsburgh Penguins || Civic Arena || 8–10–4 || 20
|-

|- style="background:#fcf;"
| 23 || Dec 1 || Pittsburgh Penguins || 3–6 || Buffalo Sabres || Buffalo Memorial Auditorium || 8–11–4 || 20
|- style="background:#cfc;"
| 24 || Dec 4 || Toronto Maple Leafs || 2–4 || Pittsburgh Penguins || Civic Arena || 9–11–4 || 22
|- style="background:#fcf;"
| 25 || Dec 7 || Pittsburgh Penguins || 2–5 || Montreal Canadiens || Montreal Forum || 9–12–4 || 22
|- style="background:#fcf;"
| 26 || Dec 8 || Pittsburgh Penguins || 2–3 || Boston Bruins || Boston Garden || 9–13–4 || 22
|- style="background:#ffc;"
| 27 || Dec 12 || Montreal Canadiens || 3–3 || Pittsburgh Penguins || Civic Arena || 9–13–5 || 23
|- style="background:#cfc;"
| 28 || Dec 14 || Chicago Black Hawks || 3–6 || Pittsburgh Penguins || Civic Arena || 10–13–5 || 25
|- style="background:#cfc;"
| 29 || Dec 15 || Pittsburgh Penguins || 3–2 || Detroit Red Wings || Olympia Stadium || 11–13–5 || 27
|- style="background:#fcf;"
| 30 || Dec 18 || Pittsburgh Penguins || 4–6 || Toronto Maple Leafs || Maple Leaf Gardens || 11–14–5 || 27
|- style="background:#ffc;"
| 31 || Dec 19 || Kansas City Scouts || 4–4 || Pittsburgh Penguins || Civic Arena || 11–14–6 || 28
|- style="background:#fcf;"
| 32 || Dec 21 || Pittsburgh Penguins || 7–8 || Minnesota North Stars || Met Center || 11–15–6 || 28
|- style="background:#fcf;"
| 33 || Dec 22 || Pittsburgh Penguins || 0–4 || Philadelphia Flyers || The Spectrum || 11–16–6 || 28
|- style="background:#ffc;"
| 34 || Dec 26 || St. Louis Blues || 2–2 || Pittsburgh Penguins || Civic Arena || 11–16–7 || 29
|- style="background:#ffc;"
| 35 || Dec 28 || Atlanta Flames || 3–3 || Pittsburgh Penguins || Civic Arena || 11–16–8 || 30
|- style="background:#cfc;"
| 36 || Dec 30 || Toronto Maple Leafs || 5–7 || Pittsburgh Penguins || Civic Arena || 12–16–8 || 32
|-

|- style="background:#cfc;"
| 37 || Jan 2 || Minnesota North Stars || 3–6 || Pittsburgh Penguins || Civic Arena || 13–16–8 || 34
|- style="background:#cfc;"
| 38 || Jan 4 || Vancouver Canucks || 3–4 || Pittsburgh Penguins || Civic Arena || 14–16–8 || 36
|- style="background:#fcf;"
| 39 || Jan 8 || Pittsburgh Penguins || 5–7 || Chicago Black Hawks || Chicago Stadium || 14–17–8 || 36
|- style="background:#ffc;"
| 40 || Jan 10 || Pittsburgh Penguins || 3–3 || Atlanta Flames || Omni Coliseum || 14–17–9 || 37
|- style="background:#cfc;"
| 41 || Jan 11 || California Golden Seals || 3–6 || Pittsburgh Penguins || Civic Arena || 15–17–9 || 39
|- style="background:#cfc;"
| 42 || Jan 15 || Atlanta Flames || 3–5 || Pittsburgh Penguins || Civic Arena || 16–17–9 || 41
|- style="background:#ffc;"
| 43 || Jan 18 || Boston Bruins || 4–4 || Pittsburgh Penguins || Civic Arena || 16–17–10 || 42
|- style="background:#cfc;"
| 44 || Jan 19 || Pittsburgh Penguins || 3–2 || Washington Capitals || Capital Centre || 17–17–10 || 44
|- style="background:#cfc;"
| 45 || Jan 22 || California Golden Seals || 5–7 || Pittsburgh Penguins || Civic Arena || 18–17–10 || 46
|- style="background:#cfc;"
| 46 || Jan 25 || New York Rangers || 2–5 || Pittsburgh Penguins || Civic Arena || 19–17–10 || 48
|- style="background:#fcf;"
| 47 || Jan 26 || Pittsburgh Penguins || 2–7 || Montreal Canadiens || Montreal Forum || 19–18–10 || 48
|- style="background:#cfc;"
| 48 || Jan 29 || Chicago Black Hawks || 1–6 || Pittsburgh Penguins || Civic Arena || 20–18–10 || 50
|- style="background:#fcf;"
| 49 || Jan 30 || Pittsburgh Penguins || 2–5 || Detroit Red Wings || Olympia Stadium || 20–19–10 || 50
|-

|- style="background:#ffc;"
| 50 || Feb 1 || Pittsburgh Penguins || 4–4 || St. Louis Blues || St. Louis Arena || 20–19–11 || 51
|- style="background:#cfc;"
| 51 || Feb 4 || Pittsburgh Penguins || 3–2 || Vancouver Canucks || Pacific Coliseum || 21–19–11 || 53
|- style="background:#cfc;"
| 52 || Feb 5 || Pittsburgh Penguins || 3–2 || Los Angeles Kings || The Forum || 22–19–11 || 55
|- style="background:#cfc;"
| 53 || Feb 7 || Pittsburgh Penguins || 4–1 || California Golden Seals || Oakland Coliseum Arena || 23–19–11 || 57
|- style="background:#fcf;"
| 54 || Feb 11 || Pittsburgh Penguins || 1–2 || New York Islanders || Nassau Veterans Memorial Coliseum || 23–20–11 || 57
|- style="background:#ffc;"
| 55 || Feb 12 || Buffalo Sabres || 3–3 || Pittsburgh Penguins || Civic Arena || 23–20–12 || 58
|- style="background:#cfc;"
| 56 || Feb 15 || Pittsburgh Penguins || 8–3 || Toronto Maple Leafs || Maple Leaf Gardens || 24–20–12 || 60
|- style="background:#cfc;"
| 57 || Feb 16 || New York Islanders || 2–3 || Pittsburgh Penguins || Civic Arena || 25–20–12 || 62
|- style="background:#ffc;"
| 58 || Feb 19 || Los Angeles Kings || 2–2 || Pittsburgh Penguins || Civic Arena || 25–20–13 || 63
|- style="background:#cfc;"
| 59 || Feb 22 || St. Louis Blues || 2–3 || Pittsburgh Penguins || Civic Arena || 26–20–13 || 65
|- style="background:#fcf;"
| 60 || Feb 23 || Detroit Red Wings || 3–1 || Pittsburgh Penguins || Civic Arena || 26–21–13 || 65
|- style="background:#fcf;"
| 61 || Feb 25 || Pittsburgh Penguins || 4–6 || Boston Bruins || Boston Garden || 26–22–13 || 65
|- style="background:#cfc;"
| 62 || Feb 26 || Washington Capitals || 1–3 || Pittsburgh Penguins || Civic Arena || 27–22–13 || 67
|-

|- style="background:#cfc;"
| 63 || Mar 1 || Vancouver Canucks || 3–7 || Pittsburgh Penguins || Civic Arena || 28–22–13 || 69
|- style="background:#cfc;"
| 64 || Mar 2 || Pittsburgh Penguins || 8–6 || New York Rangers || Madison Square Garden (IV) || 29–22–13 || 71
|- style="background:#ffc;"
| 65 || Mar 5 || Pittsburgh Penguins || 4–4 || Kansas City Scouts || Kemper Arena || 29–22–14 || 72
|- style="background:#cfc;"
| 66 || Mar 8 || Philadelphia Flyers || 2–8 || Pittsburgh Penguins || Civic Arena || 30–22–14 || 74
|- style="background:#fcf;"
| 67 || Mar 9 || Pittsburgh Penguins || 4–8 || Buffalo Sabres || Buffalo Memorial Auditorium || 30–23–14 || 74
|- style="background:#cfc;"
| 68 || Mar 12 || Boston Bruins || 3–5 || Pittsburgh Penguins || Civic Arena || 31–23–14 || 76
|- style="background:#fcf;"
| 69 || Mar 13 || Pittsburgh Penguins || 0–6 || Philadelphia Flyers || The Spectrum || 31–24–14 || 76
|- style="background:#cfc;"
| 70 || Mar 15 || Washington Capitals || 1–12 || Pittsburgh Penguins || Civic Arena || 32–24–14 || 78
|- style="background:#cfc;"
| 71 || Mar 16 || Kansas City Scouts || 3–6 || Pittsburgh Penguins || Civic Arena || 33–24–14 || 80
|- style="background:#fcf;"
| 72 || Mar 18 || Pittsburgh Penguins || 2–5 || St. Louis Blues || St. Louis Arena || 33–25–14 || 80
|- style="background:#ffc;"
| 73 || Mar 19 || Pittsburgh Penguins || 3–3 || California Golden Seals || Oakland Coliseum Arena || 33–25–15 || 81
|- style="background:#fcf;"
| 74 || Mar 22 || Pittsburgh Penguins || 0–4 || Los Angeles Kings || The Forum || 33–26–15 || 81
|- style="background:#cfc;"
| 75 || Mar 26 || Montreal Canadiens || 4–6 || Pittsburgh Penguins || Civic Arena || 34–26–15 || 83
|- style="background:#cfc;"
| 76 || Mar 29 || Pittsburgh Penguins || 4–2 || Detroit Red Wings || Olympia Stadium || 35–26–15 || 85
|- style="background:#cfc;"
| 77 || Mar 30 || Minnesota North Stars || 1–4 || Pittsburgh Penguins || Civic Arena || 36–26–15 || 87
|-

|- style="background:#fcf;"
| 78 || Apr 2 || Pittsburgh Penguins || 0–6 || Montreal Canadiens || Montreal Forum || 36–27–15 || 87
|- style="background:#cfc;"
| 79 || Apr 5 || Detroit Red Wings || 1–7 || Pittsburgh Penguins || Civic Arena || 37–27–15 || 89
|- style="background:#fcf;"
| 80 || Apr 6 || Pittsburgh Penguins || 4–8 || Washington Capitals || Capital Centre || 37–28–15 || 89
|-

|- style="text-align:center;"
| Legend:       = Win       = Loss       = Tie

Playoffs

Preliminary Round vs. St. Louis Blues

Quarterfinals vs. New York Islanders

Player statistics
Skaters

Goaltenders

†Denotes player spent time with another team before joining the Penguins.  Stats reflect time with the Penguins only.
‡Denotes player was traded mid-season.  Stats reflect time with the Penguins only.

Awards and records
 Jean Pronovost became the first player to score 300 points for the Penguins. He did so in a 5–5 tie with Boston on October 23.
 Syl Apps Jr. became the first player to record 200 assists for the Penguins. He did so in a 7–5 win over Toronto on December 30.
 Jean Pronovost became the first person to play 500 games for the Penguins. He did so in an 8–6 win over New York on March 2.
 Pierre Larouche established a rookie record for the Penguins in terms of goals (31) assists (37) and points (68).
 Ron Schock established a new franchise record for assists in a season with 63, besting the previous high of 61 held by Syl Apps Jr.
 Ron Schock established a new franchise record for points in a season with 86, besting the previous high of 85 held by Syl Apps Jr.
 Ron Stackhouse established a new franchise defenseman record for assists (45) and points (60) in a season. He topped the previous highs held by Duane Rupp (28 assists) and Darryl Edstrand (39 points).

Transactions
The Penguins were involved in the following transactions during the 1974–75 season:

Trades

Additions and subtractions

Draft picks

Pittsburgh Penguins' picks at the 1974 NHL amateur draft. 

Draft notes

 The Pittsburgh Penguins' second-round pick went to the St. Louis Blues as the result of a January 17, 1974, trade that sent Steve Durbano, Ab DeMarco, and Bob Kelly to the Penguins in exchange for Bryan Watson, Greg Polis and this pick.
 The Detroit Red Wings' second-round pick went to the Pittsburgh Penguins as a result of an October 6, 1972, trade that sent Roy Edwards to the Red Wings in exchange for a 1973 second-round pick and this pick.
 The Pittsburgh Penguins' third-round pick went to the Detroit Red Wings as the result of a June 27, 1974, trade that sent Nelson Debenedet to the Penguins in exchange for Hank Nowak and this pick.

References
 
 Player stats at Hockey Database
 Game log on NHL Database

Pittsburgh Penguins seasons
Pittsburgh
Pittsburgh
Pitts
Pitts